The American Community Survey (ACS) is a demographics survey program conducted by the U.S. Census Bureau. It regularly gathers information previously contained only in the long form of the decennial census, including ancestry, citizenship, educational attainment, income, language proficiency, migration, disability, employment, and housing characteristics. These data are used by many public-sector, private-sector, and not-for-profit stakeholders to allocate funding, track shifting demographics, plan for emergencies, and learn about local communities.  Sent to approximately 295,000 addresses monthly (or 3.5 million per year), it is the largest household survey that the Census Bureau administers.

The American Community Survey gathers information annually in the 50 U.S. states, the District of Columbia, and Puerto Rico. It does not gather information in the four major U.S. territories, American Samoa, Guam, Northern Mariana Islands, and the U.S. Virgin Islands.

History
The United States Constitution (Article I, Section II) requires an enumeration of the population every ten years "in such Manner as they (Congress) shall by Law direct". From the first census in 1790, legislators understood that it should collect basic demographic information beyond the number of people in the household. James Madison first proposed including questions in the census to "enable them to adapt the public measures to the particular circumstances of the community". Such knowledge collected with each census, he said, "would give them an opportunity of marking the progress of the society". The questions included in censuses since 1790 have reflected American understandings of and concerns about societal trends and the growing nation's expanded data needs.

By 1940, advancements in statistical methods enabled the Census Bureau to start asking a sample of the population a subset of additional detailed questions without unduly increasing cost or respondent burden. In subsequent decades, questions that had previously been asked of all respondents, as well as new questions, moved to the sample questionnaire form.  As that form grew longer than the census form sent to most households, it became known as the census "long form".

Following the 1960 Census, federal, state and local government officials, as well as those working in the private sector, began demanding more timely long-form-type data. Lawmakers representing rural districts claimed they were at a data disadvantage, unable to self-fund additional surveys of their populations.   Congress explored the creation of a mid-decade census, holding hearings and even authorizing a mid-decade census in 1976, but not funding it.

Efforts to obtain data on a more frequent basis began again after the 1990 Census, when it became clear that the more burdensome long form was depressing overall census response rates and jeopardizing the accuracy of the count. At Congress's request, the Census Bureau developed and tested a new design to obtain long-form data. U.S. statistician Leslie Kish had introduced the concept of a rolling sample (or continuous measurement) design in 1981. This design featured ongoing, monthly data collection aggregated on a yearly basis, enabling annual data releases. By combining multiple years of this data, the Census Bureau could release "period" estimates to produce estimates for smaller areas. After a decade of testing, it launched as the American Community Survey in 2005, replacing the once-a-decade census long form.

Implementation
The ACS has an initial sample of approximately 3.5 million housing unit addresses and group quarters in the United States. The Census Bureau selects a random sample of addresses to be included in the ACS. Each address has about a 1-in-480 chance of being selected in a given month, and no address should be selected more than once every five years. Data is collected by internet, mail, telephone interviews and in-person interviews. Approximately one third of those who do not respond to the survey by mail or telephone are randomly selected for in-person interviews.  About 95 percent of households across all response modes ultimately respond.

Like the decennial census, ACS responses are confidential. Every employee at the Census Bureau takes an oath of nondisclosure and is sworn for life to not disclose identifying information. Violations can result in a 5-year prison sentence and/or $250,000 fine. Under , census responses are "immune from legal process" and may not "be admitted as evidence or used for any purpose in any action, suit, or other judicial or administrative proceeding".

Data availability 

The Census Bureau aggregates individual ACS responses, also known as microdata, into estimates at many geographic summary levels. Among these summary levels are legal and administrative entities such as states, counties, cities, and congressional districts, as well as statistical entities such as metropolitan statistical areas, tracts, block groups, and census designated places. Estimates for census blocks are not available from ACS. Puerto Rico is the only U.S. territory that is part of the ACS program.

In order to balance geographic resolution, temporal frequency, statistical significance, and respondent privacy, ACS estimates released each year are aggregated from responses received in the previous calendar year or previous five calendar years. The Census Bureau provides guidance for data users about which data set to use when analyzing different population and geography sizes.

From 2007 to 2013, 3-year estimates were available for areas with 20,000 people or more. This data product was discontinued in 2015 due to budget cuts. The last 3-year release was the 2011-2013 ACS 3-year estimates.

Current data releases include:
 1-year estimates are available for areas with a population of at least 65,000 people. The 2015 ACS 1-year estimates were released in 2016 and summarize responses received in 2015 for all states but only 26% of counties due to the 65,000 minimum population threshold. This is most suitable for data users interested in shorter-term changes at medium to large geographic scales.
 Supplemental estimates are shown in annual tables summarizing populations for geographies with populations of 20,000 or more.
 5-year estimates are available for areas down to the block group scale, on the order of 600 to 3000 people. The 2015 ACS 5-year estimates, summarizing data from 2011 to 2015, were released in 2016.

Within the last 10 years, the American Community Survey has collected and supplied all data at local levels. This was a large breakthrough in the survey because it allows the American people more individualized data on a community level as opposed to extrapolating from data collected over a larger area. It has also provided unparalleled information to be more accessible for local government planning and financing. The increase in data availability on a smaller scale is a necessary and welcome addition to the ACS. While the addition is welcome, it does not always accurately reflect a smaller population. Many conclusions for local data is averaged from various information across the area, and while useful, it is not always an adequate representation.

ACS estimates are available via a number of online data tools. U.S. Census website (AFF) is the primary tool for disseminating ACS data, allowing users to drill down to specific tables and geographies (starting with 2013 estimates, AFF also includes block group data). A selection of the most popular tables is shown in QuickFacts. Other tools include OnTheMap for Emergency Management, Census Business Builder and My Congressional District. My Tribal Area featuring 5-year estimates for federally recognized tribes, launched in 2017. The Summary File is the most detailed data source, and is available as a series of downloadable text files or through an application programming interface (API) for software developers.

Custom cross-tabulations of ACS questions can be made using the Public Use Microdata Sample (PUMS), freely accessible through the Census Bureau website and Integrated Public Use Microdata Series. PUMS data contain responses to every question from a sample of respondents. To protect respondent privacy, PUMS data are anonymized and only available down to areas containing 100,000 people or more known as Public Use Microdata Areas (PUMAs). The analysis of all ACS microdata without the sampling and anonymization in PUMS is restricted to qualified researchers at secure Federal Statistical Research Data Centers (FSRDCs).

Controversy

Support
American Community Survey data provides important information that cannot be found elsewhere. The federal government, as well as various businesses, researchers, and local governments use ACS data for planning and decision-making purposes.  ACS data are used by public and business decision-makers to more clearly identify issues and opportunities and more effectively allocate scarce resources to address them. In Fiscal Year 2008, 184 federal domestic assistance programs used ACS-related datasets to help guide the distribution of $416 billion, 29 percent of all federal assistance.

The American Community Survey is authorized by 13 U.S.C. § 141 and 13 U.S.C. § 193. Federal courts have held that the long form is constitutional.

In 2000, the U.S. District Court for the Southern District of Texas ruled that the 2000 Census and the 2000 Census questions did not violate the Fourth Amendment or other constitutional provisions as alleged by plaintiffs.  The court said responses to census questions are not a violation of a citizen's right to privacy or speech.

The court's decision was later affirmed by the United States Court of Appeals for the Fifth Circuit, and the U.S. Supreme Court denied petition for writ of certiorari. Additionally, a number of other courts, including the U.S. Supreme Court, have consistently held through the years that the census and the questions in the census are authorized by both the Constitution and statute.

In 2002, the GAO confirmed that the Census Bureau has authority to conduct the survey and "require responses from the public".   
All individual American Community Survey responses are kept private and are used (along with other ACS responses) to create estimates of demographic characteristics for various geographies. Because of data swapping techniques to ensure confidentiality, it is impossible to figure out how individual people responded based on data from published ACS estimates.

Opposition
Opponents of the American Community Survey disagree with the court's findings about its constitutionality. They believe the survey asks for more information, and at a higher frequency, than the simple enumeration required by Article 1, Section 2 of the U.S. Constitution. Rep. Ron Paul of Texas, who opposes the ACS, said of it that the founding fathers of the United States "never authorized the federal government to continuously survey the American people".
   
Those who decline to complete the survey may receive visits to their homes from Census Bureau personnel. Because it is a mandatory survey, it is governed by federal laws that could impose a fine of as much as $5,000 for refusing to participate.

To date, no person has been prosecuted for refusing to answer the ACS. Former Director of the Census Bureau Kenneth Prewitt remarked that the Department of Commerce is "not an enforcement agency" and that "the Department of Justice would have to do the prosecution, and we don't recommend that". The Census Bureau prefers to gain cooperation by convincing respondents of the importance of participation, while acknowledging that the mandate improves response rates (and thus accuracy) and lowers the annual cost of survey administration by more than $90 million.

In 2014, the Census Project, a collaboration of pro-Census business and industry associations, gathered signatures from 96 national and local organizations urging the US House Committee on Oversight and Government Reform to reject a proposal to make the American Community Survey voluntary.  Signers included the US Chamber of Commerce, the National Association of Realtors and the US Conference of Mayors. The letter cited results from a congressionally mandated test of a voluntary ACS that found that mail response rates would drop "dramatically," by more than 20 percentage points.   The resulting loss in quality and reliability would essentially eliminate data for 41 percent of U.S. counties, small cities, towns and villages, many school districts, neighborhoods, remote areas, and American Indian reservations.

See also
 List of household surveys in the United States
 National Household Survey, a similar survey that is a successor to the 2011 long-form Canadian census

Notes

References

External links
 American Community Survey site at the United States Census Bureau
 ACS data from the Integrated Public Use Microdata Series
 American FactFinder – United States Census Bureau's Searchable Database
 Access to all survey questionnaires used from 1996 to 2011
 American Community Survey (ACS) User Guide for Disability Statistics
 US Code Title 13

United States Census Bureau
Household surveys
2005 establishments in the United States